Amalda lochii is a species of sea snail, a marine gastropod mollusk in the family Ancillariidae, the olives.

Description

Distribution

References

 Ninomiya T. (1990). A new subgenus and five new species of Ancillinae from Australia. Venus 49 (4) Page 69-81

lochii
Gastropods described in 1990